Soviet Union and state terrorism may refer to:
Terrorism and the Soviet Union
Terrorism in the Soviet Union 
The Great Purge, which is often described as state terror among people who grant recognition to that concept